Raúl Dome Sanhouse (born 7 May 1942) is a Venezuelan sprinter. He competed in the 4 × 400 metres relay at the 1968 Summer Olympics and the 1972 Summer Olympics.

References

1942 births
Living people
Athletes (track and field) at the 1968 Summer Olympics
Athletes (track and field) at the 1971 Pan American Games
Athletes (track and field) at the 1972 Summer Olympics
Venezuelan male sprinters
Olympic athletes of Venezuela
Place of birth missing (living people)
Pan American Games competitors for Venezuela